Schöntal is a municipality in the district of Hohenlohe in Baden-Württemberg, Germany. It is principally known as the location of Schöntal Abbey.

Subdivisions 
The munisipality consists of the following districts.
 Aschhausen  
 Berlichingen 
 Bieringen 
 Schöntal Abbey 
 Marlach  
 Oberkessach 
 Sindeldorf 
 Westernhausen
 Winzenhofen

History
Following the dissolution of Schöntal Abbey in 1802, its constituent towns were governed by the Kingdom of Württemberg as they had existed under the monastery. In 1938, these were all given to the Künzelsau district of the Free People's State of Württemberg. The Bundesautobahn 81, running through Schöntal, began operation in 1974.

Geography
The municipality (Gemeinde) of Schöntal comprises  of the Hohenlohe district, within the state of Baden-Württemberg and the Federal Republic of Germany. The highest elevation, is found in the east of the municipal area.

Coat of arms
The municipal coat of arms for Schöntal displays an armored fist in silver and a crosier in gold crossed diagonally over a green field but behind the Zisterzienserbalken, a checkerboard-pattern red-and-white bar associated with the Cistercian Order. This pattern was issued by the Hohenlohe district government on 19 September 1978, but evolved from renditions of a pattern in 1972 that omitted the armored hand, a reference to Götz von Berlichingen, who is buried in Schöntal. The crosier and the bar references the Cistercians, whose iconography, most prominently Schöntal Abbey's church, had been used to identify Schöntal in postage stamps in the past.

References

External links
 Official website (in German)

Towns in Baden-Württemberg
Hohenlohe (district)